Alexander Wachter (born 21 January 1995) is an Austrian former professional cyclist.

Major results

2011
 2nd  Criterium, European Youth Summer Olympic Festival
2012
 1st  Road race, UEC European Junior Road Championships
 1st  Road race, National Junior Road Championships
 1st Stage 4 Trofeo Karlsberg
2013
 National Junior Road Championships
1st  Road race
2nd Time trial
 3rd Overall Grand Prix Général Patton
 5th Overall Trofeo Karlsberg
 7th Overall Oberösterreich Juniorenrundfahrt
1st Points classification
1st Stage 1
2015
 4th Poreč Trophy
 6th Overall Carpathian Couriers Race
1st Stage 1

References

External links

1995 births
Living people
Austrian male cyclists
21st-century Austrian people